The Tibetan calendar, or Tibetan lunar calendar, is a lunisolar calendar, that is, the Tibetan year is composed of either 12 or 13 lunar months, each beginning and ending with a new moon. A thirteenth month is added every two or three years, so that an average Tibetan year is equal to the solar year.

The Tibetan New Year celebration is Losar. According to almanacs the year starts with the third Hor month. There were many different traditions in Tibet to fix the beginning of the year. The dates of Mongolian calendar are the same as the Tibetan calendar.

Every month, certain dates in the Tibetan calendar have special significance for Buddhist practices. Likewise, certain months also have significance.

Years

There were different traditions of naming years in Tibet. From the 12th century onwards, we observe the usage of two sixty-year cycles. The 60-year cycle is known as the Vṛhaspati cycle and was first introduced into Tibet by an Indian Buddhist by the name of Chandranath and Tsilu Pandit in 1025 CE. The first cycle is the rabjyung cycle. The first year of the first rabjyung cycle started in 1027. This cycle was adopted from India. The second cycle was derived from China and was called Drukchu kor (Sanskrit Vrhaspati). The first year of the first Drukchu kor cycle started in 1024. The cycles were counted by ordinal numbers, but the years within the cycles were never counted but referred to by special names. The structure of the drukchu kor was as follows:
Each year is associated with an animal and an element, similar to the Chinese zodiac. Animals have the following order:
{| border="1" class="wikitable"
| Hare||Dragon||Snake||Horse||Sheep||Monkey||Bird||Dog||Boar||Rat||Ox||Tiger
|}
Elements have the following order:
{| border="1" class="wikitable"
| Fire||Earth||Iron||Water||Wood
|}

Each element is associated with two consecutive years, first in its male aspect, then in its female aspect. For example, a male Earth-Dragon year is followed by a female Earth-Snake year, then by a male Iron-Horse year. The sex may be omitted, as it can be inferred from the animal.

The element-animal designations recur in cycles of 60 years (a Sexagenary cycle), starting with a (male) Wood-Rat year. These large cycles are numbered, the first cycle starting in 1024. Therefore, 2005 roughly corresponds to the (female) Wood-Rooster year of the 17th cycle. The first year of the sixty-year cycle of Indian origin (1027) is called rab-byung (same name as the designation of the cycle) and is equivalent to the (female) fire-Rabbit year.

{| class="wikitable"
!Year (Gregorian)!!Year according to rabjyung!!Wylie!!Element!!Animal!!Sex
|-
|2008||rabjyung 17 lo 22||sa mo glang||Earth||Rat||male
|-
|2009||rabjyung 17 lo 23||sa pho khyi||Earth||Ox||female
|-
|2010||rabjyung 17 lo 24||lcags pho stag||Iron||Tiger||male
|-
|2011||rabjyung 17 lo 25||lcags mo yos||Iron||Hare||female
|-
|2012||rabjyung 17 lo 26||chu pho 'brug||Water||Dragon||male
|-
|2013||rabjyung 17 lo 27||chu mo sbrul||Water||Snake||female
|-
|2014||rabjyung 17 lo 28||shing pho rta||Wood||Horse||male
|-
|2015||rabjyung 17 lo 29||shing mo lug||Wood||Sheep||female
|}

Years with cardinal numbers
Three relatively modern notations of cardinal numbers are used for Tibetan years.

On Tibetan banknotes from the first half of the 20th century cardinal numbers can be seen, with year 1 in 255 CE, which is a reference to the legendary 28th Emperor of Tibet, Thothori Nyantsen.

This relatively modern year notation is referred to as Bö Gyello (bod rgyal lo). In this era the first year is 127 BCE, dated to the legendary progenitor of the Yarlung dynasty, Nyatri Tsenpo.

In Tibetan calendars of the second half of the 20th century and on Tibetan coins cardinal year numbers are found with the indication of raplo, where the first year coincides with the first year of the rabjyung-cycle, that is 1027. Rab lo 928, for example, is the year of 1954 on the western Gregorian calendar.

{| class="wikitable"
!Year (Gregorian)!!Epoch127 BCE!!Epoch255!!Epoch1027
|- align=center
|From about February/March 2009||2136||1755||983
|- align=center
|From about February/March 2010||2137||1756||984
|- align=center
|From about February/March 2011||2138||1757||985
|- align=center
|From about February/March 2012||2139||1758||986
|}

Months

During the time of the Tibetan Empire (7th – 9th century) Tibetan months were named according to the four seasons:

First spring month (dpyid zla ra ba), middle spring month (dpyid zla 'bring po), last spring month (dpyid zla mtha' chung), 
first summer month (dbyar zla ra ba), middle summer month (dbyar zla 'bring po), last summer month (dbyar zla mtha' chung), 
first autumn month (ston zla ra ba), middle autumn month (ston-zla 'bring-po), last autumn month (ston zla mtha' chung), 
first winter month (dgun zla ra ba), middle winter month (dgun-zla 'bring-po) and last winter month (dgun zla mtha' chung).

From the 12th century onwards each month has been named by the 12 animals of the Chinese zodiac:

stag, (Tiger), yos (Hare), brug (Dragon), sbrul  (Snake), rta (Horse), lug (Sheep), sprel (Monkey), bya (Bird), khyi (Dog), phag (Boar), byi ba (Rat), and glang (Ox).

With the introduction of the calendar of the Kalacakratantra in the second half of the 11th century, months were also named via lunar mansions within which, roughly speaking, a full moon took place each month:

In the second half of the 13th century the famous ruler Drogön Chögyal Phagpa introduced the system of counting the month by ordinal numbers, the so-called Hor "Mongolian" month:

All these systems of counting or naming months were used up to modern times.

Days

The first two of these days are astronomical days. The time needed for the mean sun to pass through one of the twelve traditional signs of the zodiac (the twelve ) is called  (solar month). One-thirtieth of one solar month is one , which might be called a zodiacal day, because there is no equivalent name in Western terminology.

The time needed by the moon to elongate 12 degrees from the sun and every 12 degrees thereafter is one tithi ("lunar day"). The lengths of such lunar days vary considerably due to variations in the movements of the moon and sun.

Thirty lunar days form one lunar or synodic month, the period from new moon to new moon. This is equal to the time needed for the moon to elongate 360 degrees from the sun (sun to sun). The natural day is defined by Tibetans as the period from dawn to dawn. Strictly speaking, the months appearing in a Tibetan almanac, called by us Tibetan calendar months, are not the same as lunar or synodic months, which can begin and end at any time of day. In Tibetan, there is no special term for a calendar month containing whole days. These calendar months are just called  (month).

A Tibetan calendar month normally starts with the week day or natural day ( or ) in which the first tithi ends.  A Tibetan calendar month normally ends with the week day or natural day ( or ) in which the 30th  ends. In consequence, a Tibetan calendar month comprises 29 or 30 natural days. In the sequence of natural days or week days, there are no omitted days or days that occur twice. But since these days are also named by the term  together with a cardinal number, it happens that certain numbers or dates (the corresponding tithi) do not occur at all or appear twice. The  are counted from 1 to 30 and it can happen that a Monday with the lunar day number 1 is followed by a Tuesday with the moon day number 3. On the other hand, a Monday with the lunar day number 1 may be followed by a Tuesday with the lunar day number 1. In other words, it happens quite often that certain dates do not appear in the Tibetan almanac and certain dates occur twice. But there are no natural days or week days that occur twice or which are omitted.

The days of the week are named for astronomical objects.

{| class="wikitable"
|-
! Day !! Tibetan (Wylie) !! Phonetic transcription !! Object
|-
| Sunday || གཟའ་ཉི་མ་ (gza' nyi ma) || nyima || Sun
|-
| Monday || གཟའ་ཟླ་བ་ (gza' zla wa) || dawa || Moon
|-
| Tuesday || གཟའ་མིག་དམར་ (gza' mig dmar) || Mikmar || Mars
|-
| Wednesday || གཟའ་ལྷག་པ་ (gza' lhak pa) || Lhakpa || Mercury
|-
| Thursday || གཟའ་ཕུར་བུ། (gza' phur bu) || Purbu || Jupiter
|-
| Friday || གཟའ་པ་སངས་ (gza' pa sangs) || Pasang || Venus
|-
| Saturday || གཟའ་སྤེན་པ་ (gza' spen ba) || Penba || Saturn
|}

Nyima "Sun", Dawa "Moon" and Lhakpa "Mercury" are common personal names for people born on Sunday, Monday or Wednesday respectively.

History
During the time of the Yarlung dynasty, years were named after the 12 animals common in the Chinese zodiac. The months were named according to the four seasons of a year and the year started in summer.

The translation of the Kalachakratantra in the second half of the 11th century CE marked the beginning of a complete change for the calendar in Tibet.  The first chapter of this book contains among others a description of an Indian astronomical calendar and descriptions of the calculations to determine the progression of the five planets and the sun and moon eclipses.

According to the Buddhist tradition, the original teachings of the Kalacakra were taught by Buddha himself. Nevertheless, it took more than two hundred years until the Kalacakra calendar was officially introduced as the Tibetan calendar by the ruler Drogön Chögyal Phagpa in the second half of the 13th century. Although this calendar was changed many times during the subsequent centuries, it kept its original character as a luni-solar calendar of Indian origin.

See also 
 Buddhist calendar
 Horology

Notes

Primary sources 

 (Sanskrit) Kalacakratantra. (Tibetisch) mChog gi dang-po sangs-rgyas las phyung-ba rgyud kyi rgyal-po dus kyi 'khor-lo.
 Grags-pa rgyal-mchan: Dus-tshod bzung-ba'i rtsis-yig
 sde-srid Sangs-rgyas rgya-mtsho: Phug-lugs rtsis kyi legs-bshad mkhas-pa'i mgul-rgyan vaidur dkar-po'i do-shal dpyod-ldan snying-nor
 karma Nges-legs bstan-'jin: gTsug-lag rtsis-rigs tshang-ma'i lag-len 'khrul-med mun-sel nyi-ma ñer-mkho'i 'dod-pa 'jo-ba'i bum-bzang

Secondary sources 

 Svante Janson, Tibetan Calendar Mathematics, accessed December 16, 2009

External links

Specific calendars
Tibetan culture
Tibetan Buddhist art and culture
Lunisolar calendars